Energetics is the study of energy, and may refer to:
 Thermodynamics
 Bioenergetics
 Energy flow (ecology)